The 2010 North African Cup of Champions was the third edition of the competition since its inception in 2008. The league champions from Morocco, Algeria, Libya and Tunisia will face off for the title.

Tunisian side Club Africain won the title after defeating MC Alger of Algeria 3-1 on aggregate in the final. It was the second time that the club won the competition.

Participating teams 
 MC Alger (2009–10 Algerian Championnat National winners)
 Ittihad Tripoli (2009–10 Libyan Premier League winners)
 Club Africain (2009–10 Tunisian Ligue Professionnelle 1 runners-up)1
 Wydad Casablanca (2009–10 Botola winners)

Prize money
The following prize money will be handed out for the 2010 edition:

 Champions: $150,000
 Runner-up: $80,000
 Semi-finalists: $35,000

Draw

Semifinals 

|}

First legs

Second legs

Final

|}

First leg

Second leg

Champions

See also
 2010 North African Cup Winners Cup
 2011 North African Super Cup

References

External links
 Draw for 2010 edition on Algerian FA Website

2010
2010 in African football
2010–11 in Moroccan football
2010–11 in Algerian football
2010–11 in Libyan football
2010–11 in Tunisian football